Solomou is a surname. Notable people with the surname include:

Athos Solomou (born 1985), Cypriot footballer
Despoina Solomou (born 1990), Greek swimmer
Emilios Solomou (born 1971), Cypriot writer
Maria Solomou (born 1974), Greek actress
Solomos Solomou, British economist